Andrew Sarvis (December 22, 1907 – October 29, 1976), nicknamed "Smoky", was an American Negro league pitcher between 1939 and 1944.

A native of Seville, Florida, Sarvis made his Negro leagues debut in 1939 for the Cleveland Bears. He went on to play for the Jacksonville Red Caps in 1941, and finished his career with Jacksonville in 1944. Sarvis died in Jacksonville, Florida in 1976 at age 68.

References

External links
 and Baseball-Reference Black Baseball stats and Seamheads

1907 births
1976 deaths
Cleveland Bears players
Jacksonville Red Caps players
Baseball pitchers
Baseball players from Florida
People from Volusia County, Florida
20th-century African-American sportspeople